Grubb Parsons (legally 'Sir Howard Grubb, Parsons and Co. Ltd.') was a historic manufacturer of telescopes, active in the 19th and 20th centuries. They built numerous large research telescopes, including several that were (at the time of construction) the largest in the world of their type.

It was founded in 1833 by Thomas Grubb as the Grubb Telescope Company, located in Dublin. Control of the company passed to his son Howard Grubb in the 1860s. They produced dozens of telescopes, including some of the largest of the 19th century, such as the  Great Melbourne Telescope (a reflecting telescope) in 1868, a  refractor for the Vienna Observatory in 1878, and the Greenwich 28 inch refractor in 1893. Leading up to and during the First World War (1914-18) the company produced periscopes for submarines and moved to St Albans in 1918.

In 1925 the company was purchased by Charles Algernon Parsons, renamed Grubb Parsons, and moved to Newcastle upon Tyne. In the 20th century they produced large research telescopes including the Isaac Newton Telescope (1965), Anglo-Australian Telescope (1965) and UK Infrared Telescope (1979). Their final project was the William Herschel Telescope in 1985, after which the company shut down.

Grubb Telescope Company 

The company was founded in Dublin by the Irish engineer Thomas Grubb in 1833, as the Grubb Telescope Company. The company's first order was the mount for the  telescope at Markree Observatory, which became the largest refracting telescope in the world. This was followed by a  reflecting telescope for Armagh Observatory, which used the Cassegrain layout and was provided with a equatorial mount which could track targets automatically using a clock drive; both were innovative features that had not been used on large telescopes before and were widely adopted thereafter.

Orders from outside Ireland soon followed, including the  Sheepshanks equatorial refractor for the Royal Observatory, Greenwich (London, 1838) and a  refractor for the United States Military Academy (West Point, 1840), both using lenses that had been produced in Paris. The Grubb company operated a public observatory with a  refractor at its workshop in Dublin, as a visitor attraction.

With Thomas Grubb approaching retirement, in 1865 he was joined in managing the company by his son Howard Grubb. Thomas Grubb retired in 1868 and died in 1878. Howard Grubb solidified the company's reputation for high-quality optical instruments, and was knighted in 1887.

In 1868 the company completed the  Great Melbourne Telescope, one of the last large instruments to use a speculum primary mirror. It was the second largest telescope in the world at that time, and the largest that was fully steerable. A  reflector was produced for Royal Observatory, Edinburgh (1872, at Calton Hill Observatory). The company constructed a  refractor for the Vienna Observatory in 1878, which was then the largest refractor in the world and regarded as being of high optical quality.

The Melbourne and Vienna telescopes substantially enhanced the reputation of the company, leading to numerous orders for new telescopes. In 1887 Grubb's firm built seven identical astrographs for the international Carte du Ciel project; the 13 inch refracting telescopes were designed to produce uniform photographic plates. In 1896 they produced a  reflector for the Royal Observatory, Greenwich. The company produced an 18/24-inch double refractor for the Royal Observatory, Cape of Good Hope (South Africa, 1897) and a copy for the Radcliffe Observatory (Oxford, 1901).

After the submarine periscope was invented in 1902, Howard Grubb patented several improvements to their design. The Grubb factory began manufacturing the new instruments, which became their primary business by 1914. During the First World War, most British submarines were equipped with a periscope built by Grubb; following 1916 Easter Rising in Dublin, the periscope workshop was moved to St Albans in 1918 for security. When the military contracts ended and peace returned in 1919, the company struggled to return to profitability. Howard Grubb, then in his 70s, attempted to revive the sale of large telescopes but the company began to lose money. Several telescopes had been delayed or not completed due to the war, such as a  reflector for the National Astronomical Observatory of Chile (Santiago), which had been ordered in 1909, partially constructed in 1913, but was not operational until 1925.

Grubb Parsons 

In 1925, with Howard Grubb aged 81 and the company on the verge of bankruptcy, it was sold to Charles Parsons. Parsons was an Anglo-Irish engineer with family connections to telescope making – Parson's father William Parsons had constructed the Leviathan of Parsonstown (the largest telescope in the world from 1845-1917). The families had been friends for two generations. Charles Parsons renamed the company Grubb Parsons and moved the factory to Newcastle-upon-Tyne, where his other engineering companies were already located.

The first large telescope completed under the new management (though not the first ordered) was a  reflector for the Royal Observatory Edinburgh, which saw first light in 1930. A year later the Royal Greenwich Observatory ordered a copy of this instrument, which was constructed as the Yapp telescope. In 1931 the company provided both a  reflector and a 24/20-inch refractor for the new site of the Stockholm Observatory (Sweden).

Charles Parsons died in 1931, but Grubb Parsons remained a subsidiary of his engineering business, C. A. Parsons and Company. In 1938, the company acquired the telescope manufacturing arm of Cooke, Troughton & Simms.

The company found the standardisation of designs to be profitable, so continued the approach with a series of six near-identical  telescopes for the David Dunlap Observatory (Ontario, Canada, 1935), Radcliffe Observatory (South Africa, construction completed 1938 but first light delayed until after the Second World War), Mount Stromlo Observatory (Canberra, Australia, 1955), Haute-Provence Observatory (France, 1956, with a metric  mirror), Okayama Observatory (Japan, 1960) and Helwan Observatory (Egypt, 1963).

The next major project was the  Isaac Newton Telescope for Royal Greenwich Observatory, which had moved to Herstmonceux Castle, completed in 1965. The location was later deemed unsuitable, so from 1979-84 this telescope was moved to Roque de los Muchachos Observatory in the Canary Islands, during which Grubb Parsons upgraded it with a  mirror.

The company began to concentrate on optical systems, not mechanical designs, producing thousands of small mirrors, lenses and prisms for spectrometers as well as small telescopes. They ground and polished the primary mirror for the  Anglo-Australian Telescope (AAT) (at Siding Spring Observatory, Australia), which was completed in 1965, though its design and mounting were completed by other companies. Grubb Parsons also produced the  UK Schmidt Telescope in 1973, located adjacent to the AAT. They produced the optical components of the  UK Infrared Telescope (1979, then the largest infrared telescope in the world), but not the mechanical parts. Smaller telescopes produced by Grubb Parsons in this period included the  Jacobus Kapteyn Telescope (Roque de los Muchachos Observatory, 1979) and the optics for the  Danish National Telescope (La Silla Observatory, Chile, 1976).

The company traded until 1985, with its last project being the  William Herschel Telescope.

Historiography 

The surviving archives of the company are held at the Tyne and Wear Archives, part of the Discovery Museum in Newcastle.

Ian Glass, a historian of astronomy, wrote a history of the company under the management of Thomas and Howard Grubb, based mostly on their letters. Glass also produced catalogues of the telescopes known to have been produced by Grubb and by Grubb Parsons.

A partial history of the company under Parsons was written by its last managing director, George Sisson.

See also 
List of largest optical telescopes in the 19th century
List of largest optical telescopes in the 20th century
T. Cooke & Sons - contemporary British telescope company, founded in 1837

References

External links 
 Durham University Grubb Parson Lectures
 Former Grubb Parsons large mirror polishing machine
 Grubb and Parsons: Optical and engineering giants
 Grubb Parsons telescope construction photos
 The 36-inch telescope at Cambridge University

Telescope manufacturers
Manufacturing companies based in Newcastle upon Tyne
British companies established in 1833
British companies disestablished in 1985
1833 establishments in England
1985 disestablishments in England